The 1934 Cornell Big Red football team was an American football team that represented Cornell University during the 1934 college football season.  In their 15th season under head coach Gil Dobie, the Big Red compiled a 2–5 record and outscored their opponents by a combined total of 114 to 55.

Schedule

References

Cornell
Cornell Big Red football seasons
Cornell Big Red football